Erskine Henry Bronson (September 12, 1844 – October 19, 1920) was an American-born Canadian businessman and political figure. He represented the riding of Ottawa in the Legislative Assembly of Ontario from 1886 to 1898.

He was born in Bolton, New York in 1844, the son of Henry Franklin Bronson, and came to Bytown with his family in 1853. Bronson was educated in Ottawa at the District Grammar School and New York City. He became a partner in the Bronsons and Weston Lumber Company in 1867 and took control of the company when his father died in 1889.

Bronson served on Ottawa City Council from 1872 to 1877 and was a provincial minister in the Legislative Assembly of Ontario from 1886 to 1898. He was also a public school board trustee for 18 years.

Bronson was president of the Ottawa Power Company, Limited. This resulted from his efforts to diversify the family business.  The power house and power plant at Chaudière Falls which were erected in 1900 following the 1900 Hull–Ottawa fire were owned by this company. Bronson also was responsible for the 1891 construction of Generating Station No. 2 at the falls.  He, with Gordon B. Pattee (a lumber baron), formed Standard Electric Light Company. (This company was almost certainly actually called Standard Electric Company of Ottawa (Limited), formed in 1891 with Bronson as president, and Pattee as vice-president, which merged with others into the Ottawa Electric Company in 1894). Bronson was later director of the Ottawa Electric Company later absorbed by Ottawa Hydro.
He served as Vice President of Ottawa Electric Company, Vice President of Ottawa Light, Heat and Power Company, Limited and President of Upper Ottawa Improvement Company, Limited.  He was also president of "Bronson Company" and president of the Ottawa Carbide Company.

Bronson was also noted as a philanthropist, supporting churches, missions and charities.

Bronson retired from business in 1910. He died at Ottawa in 1920. He is buried in Beechwood Cemetery. A street in Ottawa, Bronson Avenue is named after him.

Family
Erskine H. Bronson married Ella W. Webster at Norfolk, Va., in 1874. Ella was the daughter of Prof. N. B. Webster, a cousin of the American statesman, Daniel Webster. She was a member of the Ottawa Council of Women since its first organization, and assisted in the establishment of the Associated Charities. She served as President of the Maternity Hospital, Ottawa, when it opened in 1895.

Bronson had one son and one daughter.

Electoral record

External links
The Canadian men and women of the time : a handbook of Canadian biography, HJ Morgon (1898)
Member's parliamentary history for the Legislative Assembly of Ontario

References

1844 births
1920 deaths
Ontario Liberal Party MPPs
Canadian businesspeople
American emigrants to pre-Confederation Ontario
Immigrants to the Province of Canada
Lisgar Collegiate Institute alumni